Fred Neil is the second album from Fred Neil, a pioneer folk rock musician, recorded and released in 1966. The album has a more laid-back sound than his debut, and contains his best-known songs; "Everybody's Talkin' " and "The Dolphins". It was re-released in 1969 under the title Everybody's Talkin' in response to the international success of the soundtrack of the movie Midnight Cowboy, which made a hit of the new title track for Harry Nilsson. Music journalist Richie Unterberger characterizes the album as Neil's "best", and it was listed in the first (2005) edition of the book 1001 Albums You Must Hear Before You Die, edited by Robert Dimery.

Track listing
All tracks composed by Fred Neil, except where noted

"The Dolphins" – 4:06
"I've Got a Secret (Didn't We Shake Sugaree)" – 4:40 (Elizabeth Cotten)
"That's the Bag I'm In" – 3:37
"Badi-Da" – 3:39
"Faretheewell (Fred's Tune)" – 4:03 (Traditional)
"Everybody's Talkin'" – 2:45
"Everything Happens" – 2:20
"Sweet Cocaine" – 2:03 (Traditional)
"Green Rocky Road" – 3:40
"Cynicrustpetefredjohn Raga" – 8:16

Personnel
Fred Neil – acoustic guitar, electric, mumbles, vocals, finger snapping
Pete Childs – electric guitar, acoustic guitar
John T. Forsha – acoustic guitar, 12-string guitar
Cyrus Faryar – acoustic guitar, bouzouki
Rusty Faryar – finger cymbals
Jimmy Bond – bass
Billy Mundi – drums, cymbals, tambourine
Alan Wilson – harmonica
Nick Venet – sound effects

Production
Producer – Nick Venet
Production coordination – Norma Sharp
Recording engineer – Peter Abbott, John Kraus
Art direction – Nick Venet
Photography – Jim Marshall, Edward Simpson
Liner notes – Jerry Hopkins, Bob Mehr, Fred Neil

References

External links

Fred Neil (Adobe Flash) at Radio3Net (streamed copy where licensed)

1966 albums
Fred Neil albums
Capitol Records albums
Albums produced by Nick Venet